The  is a Japanese international school in Donaustadt, Vienna, Austria. The school was established in 1978.

References

Further reading
 薫森 英夫 (前ウィーン日本人学校:名古屋大学教育学部附属中・高等学校). "ウィーン日本人学校における英語指導と実践(共同研究員報告)" 在外教育施設における指導実践記録 33, 7–11, 2010-12-24. Tokyo Gakugei University. See profile at CiNii.

External links

 Japanische Schule in Wien 
 Japanische Schule in Wien  (Archive)

Vienna
International schools in Vienna
Educational institutions established in 1978
1978 establishments in Austria